Cetelem or BNP Personal Finance is a French company specializing in consumer credit, online credit and credit cards. Cetelem is the commercial brand of financing of BNP Paribas, which is a wholly owned subsidiary of BNP Paribas, and specializes in retail financing in Europe. It is established in thirty countries, has 27 million customers and has its central office located in Paris. Cetelem is also known as Modern Credit in the French overseas territories. Other brands of BNP Paribas Personal Finance are Findomestic in Italy and AlphaCredit in Belgium.

References

External links
 Official Website

BNP Paribas